Kristina Wagner (born January 25, 1993) is an American rower. She competed in the 2020 Summer Olympics.

References

External links
 Yale Bulldogs bio

1993 births
Living people
Rowers from Boston
Sportspeople from Saratoga Springs, New York
Rowers at the 2020 Summer Olympics
American female rowers
Olympic rowers of the United States
Yale Bulldogs women's rowers